This is a list of waterfalls in the Canadian province of Nova Scotia.

List of waterfalls

Waterfalls of Nova Scotia

Notes

References

External links
 

Nova Scotia
Waterfalls